The Samsung Galaxy Tab S6 and Samsung Galaxy Tab S6 5G are Android-based tablets designed, developed, and marketed by Samsung Electronics. Galaxy Tab S6 was announced on 31 July 2019, and Galaxy Tab S6 5G was announced on 29 January 2020.

Design 
The Samsung Galaxy Tab S6 is built with an aluminum frame and a plastic back for the screen. The device is available in Mountain Gray, Cloud Blue, Rose Blush. It has stereo loudspeakers with AKG tuning. A USB-C port is used for charging and connecting other accessories.

Specifications

Hardware 
The Samsung Galaxy Tab S6 uses the Qualcomm Snapdragon system-on-chip, with 4 GB, 6 GB or 8 GB of RAM and 64 GB, 128 GB, 256 GB of non-expandable UFS 3.0 internal storage.

The Samsung Galaxy Tab S6 has a 7040 mAh battery, and is capable of fast charging at up to 15 W.

The Samsung Galaxy Tab S6 features a 10.5-inch 2560 x 1600 Super AMOLED display. The display has a 16:10 aspect ratio.

The Samsung Galaxy Tab S6 includes dual rear-facing cameras. The wide 26 mm f/2.0 lens 13-megapixel sensor, while the ultrawide f/2.2 lens has a 12-megapixel sensor; the front-facing camera uses an 8-megapixel sensor. It is capable of recording 4K video at 30 fps.

Software 
The Galaxy Tab S6 shipped with Android Pie with One UI 1.5.

References 

Samsung Galaxy Tab series
Android (operating system) devices
Tab
Tablet computers
Tablet computers introduced in 2019